Nahr-e Gabin may refer to:
 Nahr-e Gabin-e Olya
 Nahr-e Gabin-e Sofla